St. Joseph Catholic Cemetery & Mausoleums is located at Belmont and Cumberland Avenues, in River Grove, Illinois.

The cemetery was consecrated in 1904.

Notable burials
 Emil Kush (1916–1969), MLB pitcher and manager
 "Long Tom" Hughes (1878–1956), MLB pitcher
 Robert L. May (1905–1976), creator of Rudolph the Red-Nosed Reindeer
 Baby Face Nelson (1908-1934), gangster, buried with his wife Helen Gillis (1911–1987)
 Roman Pucinski (1919–2002), US Representative
 Frank M. Taylor (1869–1941), Thoroughbred racehorse trainer

References

External links
 
 

1904 establishments in Illinois
Cemeteries in Cook County, Illinois
Roman Catholic cemeteries in Illinois